Ambérieu-en-Bugey Air Base  is a front-line French Air and Space Force ( or ALA) base located approximately 5 km north-northwest of Ambérieu-en-Bugey, in the Ain department of the Rhône-Alpes region in eastern France.

Overview
Ambérieu-en-Bugey Air Base is a primary repair depot and supply centre for avionics, ground telecommunication equipment, navigation aids and the manufacture of simple equipment.

It also supports calibration and repair of all Armée de l'Air precision measuring equipment and the manufacture and repair of aircrew survival equipment.

Ambérieu has two Jodel D140C Mousquetaire aircraft assigned for courier duty.

World War II
The air base was constructed during World War II as all-weather temporary field built by the United States Army Air Forces XII Engineer Command during late August 1944 after German forces were removed from the area.   It was built on a graded surface using Pierced Steel Planking for runways and parking areas, as well as for dispersal sites.   In addition, tents were used for billeting and also for support facilities; an access road was built to the existing road infrastructure; a dump for supplies, ammunition, and gasoline drums, along with a drinkable water and minimal electrical grid for communications and station lighting.  The airfield was known as Ambérieu Airfield or Advanced Landing Ground Y-5.

It was turned over for operational use by Twelfth Air Force on 6 September. The 324th Fighter Group, which flew P-40 Warhawks from the field during September 1944, after which it moved up to Tavaux.   Once the P-47s moved out, Ambérieu Airfield became a rear area support base operated by the 1st Air Service Squadron for transport aircraft moving supplies and equipment to the front.

With the end of the war in Europe in May, 1945 the Americans began to withdraw their aircraft and personnel. Control of the airfield was turned over to French authorities on 29 May 1945.

Facilities

See also

 Advanced Landing Ground

References

French Air and Space Force bases
World War II airfields in France
Airfields of the United States Army Air Forces in France
Airports in Auvergne-Rhône-Alpes
Buildings and structures in Ain
Airports established in 1944